Melissa Brown is an ophthalmologist from Flourtown, Pennsylvania who is a member of the Republican Party.  She was also a three-time candidate for the United States House of Representatives.

Personal
Born in Memphis, Tennessee, Melissa Brown attended Keuka College and graduated with a B.S. in Nursing in 1972. With a strong interest in education, she has been on the Keuka College Board of Trustees since 1992 and was elected chair in 2010. She subsequently received her master's degree in Nursing from Emory University and then taught on the faculty at the University of Pennsylvania.

She returned to Thomas Jefferson University where she earned her M.D. in 1982. After an internship at Chestnut Hill Hospital, she completed a residency in ophthalmology at Wills Eye Hospital. Brown obtained her MBA in Strategic Management from Saint Joseph's University's Haub School of Business in 1998. She is an adjunct Senior Fellow at the Leonard Davis Institute of Medical Economics at the University of Pennsylvania.

Political career
In 1998, Brown ran in the Republican primary in Pennsylvania's 13th congressional district against incumbent U.S. Rep. Jon Fox, and came in third.

She considered a run in 2000, but withdrew in favor of State Sen. Stewart Greenleaf.

2002
In 2002, she again ran in the primary for U.S. House. Her main opponent was Al Taubenberger, a resident of Northeast Philadelphia.  Running with the support of both the Montgomery County and Philadelphia GOP committees, she won the nomination with 56% of the vote.

Post politics
Since the last election, Brown has returned to her medical practice and lecture work.

References

American ophthalmologists
Women ophthalmologists
Pennsylvania Republicans
Women in Pennsylvania politics
Saint Joseph's University alumni
People from Springfield Township, Montgomery County, Pennsylvania
Year of birth missing (living people)
Living people
Politicians from Memphis, Tennessee
Keuka College alumni
Candidates in the 1998 United States elections
Candidates in the 2002 United States elections
20th-century American women
21st-century American women politicians